Arugula (American English) or rocket (Commonwealth English) (Eruca vesicaria; syns. Eruca sativa Mill., E. vesicaria subsp. sativa (Miller) Thell., Brassica eruca L.) is an edible annual plant in the family Brassicaceae used as a leaf vegetable for its fresh, tart, bitter, and peppery flavor. Other common names include garden rocket (in Britain, Australia, South Africa, Ireland, and New Zealand), and eruca. It is also called "ruchetta," "rucola," "rucoli," "rugula," "colewort," and "roquette." Eruca vesicaria, which is widely popular as a salad vegetable, is a species of Eruca native to the Mediterranean region.

It is sometimes conflated with Diplotaxis tenuifolia, known as "perennial wall rocket," another plant of the family Brassicaceae that is used in the same manner.

Description

The pinnate leaves are deeply lobed with four to ten small lateral lobes and a large terminal lobe. The petals are creamy white with purple veins, and the stamens are yellow. The species has a chromosome number of 2n = 22.

Etymology 
Sativa, from one of the plant's synonyms, is from satum, meaning "to sow," indicating that the seeds of the plant were sown in gardens. Eruca sativa differs from E. vesicaria in having early deciduous sepals. Some botanists consider it a subspecies of Eruca vesicaria: E. vesicaria subsp. sativa. Still others do not differentiate between the two.

The English common name rocket derives from the Italian word Ruchetta or rucola, a diminutive of the Latin word eruca, which once designated a particular plant in the family Brassicaceae (probably a type of cabbage). Arugula, the common name now widespread in the United States and Canada, entered American English from a nonstandard dialect of Italian. The standard Italian word is rucola. The Oxford English Dictionary dates the first appearance of "arugula" in American English to a 1960 article in The New York Times by food editor and prolific cookbook writer Craig Claiborne.

Synonyms

Ecology

Eruca vesicaria typically grows on dry, disturbed ground. It is a source of food for the larvae of some moth species, including the garden carpet, and its roots are susceptible to nematode infestation.

Cultivation and history
A pungent, leafy green vegetable resembling a longer-leaved and open lettuce, Eruca vesicaria is rich in vitamin C and potassium. In addition to the leaves, the flowers, young seed pods, and mature seeds are all edible.

Grown as an edible and popular herb in Italy since Roman times, it was mentioned by various  ancient Roman classical authors as an aphrodisiac, most famously in a poem long ascribed to the famous 1st century Roman poet Virgil, Moretum, which contains the line: "et Venerem revocans eruca morantem" ("and the rocket, which revives drowsy Venus [sexual desire]"), and in the Ars Amatoria of Ovid. Some writers assert that for this reason, during the Middle Ages, it was forbidden to grow rocket in monasteries. It was listed, however, in a decree by Charlemagne of 802 as one of the pot herbs suitable for growing in gardens. Gillian Riley, author of the Oxford Companion to Italian Food, states that because of its reputation as a sexual stimulant, it was "prudently mixed with lettuce, which was the opposite" (i.e., calming or even soporific). Riley continues that "nowadays rocket is enjoyed innocently in mixed salads, to which it adds a pleasing pungency,"  though Norman Douglas insisted that “Salad rocket is certainly a stimulant.” 

Rocket was traditionally collected in the wild or grown in home gardens along with such herbs as parsley and basil. It is now grown commercially in many places and is available in supermarkets and farmers' markets worldwide. It is also naturalized as a wild plant away from its native range in temperate regions around the world, including northern Europe and North America. In India, the mature seeds are known as Gargeer.

Mild frost conditions hinder the plant's growth and turn the green leaves red.

Uses

Since Roman times in Italy, raw rocket has been added to salads. It is often added to a pizza at the end of or just after baking. It is also used cooked in Apulia, in southern Italy, to make the pasta dish cavatiéddi, "in which large amounts of coarsely chopped rocket are added to pasta seasoned with a homemade reduced tomato sauce and pecorino,"  as well as in "many unpretentious recipes in which it is added, chopped, to sauces and cooked dishes" or in a sauce (made by frying it in olive oil and garlic) used as a condiment for cold meats and fish. Throughout Italy, it is used as a salad with tomatoes and with either burrata, bocconcini, buffalo, and mozzarella cheese. In Rome, rucola is used in straccetti, a dish of thin slices of beef with raw rocket and Parmesan cheese.

In Turkey, similarly, the rocket is eaten raw as a side dish or salad with fish but is additionally served with a sauce of extra virgin olive oil and lemon juice.

In Slovenia, rocket is often combined with boiled potatoes or used in a soup.

In West Asia, Pakistan, and Northern India, Eruca seeds are pressed to make taramira oil, used in pickling and (after aging to remove acridity) as a salad or cooking oil. The seed cake is also used as animal feed.

Nutrition

Raw arugula is 92% water, 4% carbohydrates, and 2.5% protein and contains a negligible amount of fat. Although a  reference serving provides only  of food energy, arugula has a high nutritional value, especially when fresh, frozen, steamed, or quickly boiled. It is a rich source (20% or more of the Daily Value, DV) of folate and vitamin K. Arugula is also a good source (10–19% of DV) of vitamin A, vitamin C, and the dietary minerals calcium, magnesium, and manganese.

See also
 Yellow rocket

References

External links

 Jeane Osnos, "The most political vegetables: A whirlwind tour of the edible crucifers," The Botanist in the Kitchen, November 20, 2012. How arugula joined broccoli (and lattes) as supposed markers for big-government liberalism.
 Joel Denker, "The 'Lascivious' Leaf: The Allure of Arugula," Food in the 'Hood (published August 11, 2012) , in The Intowner, Serving Washington, D. C. since 1968.
  Ezra Klein, "Arugula", The American Prospect, October 7, 2008.
  John Schwenkler, "Eating arugula has become a political act: Conservative thinker is branded a closet liberal based on the food he eats," Earth Matters, MNN (Mother Nature Network), March 2009. Mr. Schwenkler's article originally appeared in Plenty magazine in October 2008.
 David Kamp, The United States of Arugula: How We Became a Gourmet Nation, New York: Clarkson Potter (2006). 

Brassicaceae
Leaf vegetables
Taxa named by Carl Linnaeus
Plants described in 1753